Indicis is a Latin adjective commonly used in anatomical terms pertaining to the index finger, but generally applicable to indexes of any kind.

Examples of the usage include:

 Extensor indicis muscle
 radialis indicis artery
 Moderatio Indicis librorum prohibitorum (Mitigation of the Index Librorum Prohibitorum or List of Prohibited Books)